Suruj Mia is a 1984 Bangladeshi film directed by Kazi Arefin and stars Tarik Anam, Fakhrul Hasan Boiragi and Suborna Mustafa. Boiragi earned the Bachsas Award for Best Supporting Actor in 1984 for his performance. It was displayed at a film festival in Sylhet in 2017.

References

External links

Bengali-language Bangladeshi films
1984 films
1980s Bengali-language films